The Papineau-Leblanc Bridge was one of the first cable-stayed spans in North America. It is part of Quebec Autoroute 19 and is one of the connections between Laval and Montreal, Quebec, Canada, spanning Rivière des Prairies. It was fabricated from weathering steel and has an orthotropic deck. The freeway ends abruptly at the southern end of the bridge at the intersection of Henri Bourassa Boulevard, where Autoroute 19 follows Avenue Papineau down to Quebec Autoroute 40.

The Leblanc portion of the name comes from the name of a street in Laval that was expropriated to build the autoroute. That street was named after Alpha Leblanc, a local landowner. Portions of that street remain on both sides of the autoroute.

In 2000, a proposition to rename the bridge after the late Pietro Rizzuto was initially approved, then rejected by the Commission de Toponymie du Québec, which ruled that the name Papineau-Leblanc was already entrenched in local culture and non-controversial. Most locals simply refer to this bridge as Papineau.

See also
List of bridges spanning the Rivière des Prairies
List of crossings of the Rivière des Prairies
List of bridges in Montreal
List of bridges in Canada

References

Notes

Podolny, W. Jr., and Scalzi, J. B., Construction & Design of Cable-Stayed Bridges, John Wiley & Son, New York, NY, 1976.
 Cable-Stayed Bridges: Theory and Design ( / 0-258-97034-0) Troitsky, M S
ASCE, Bridge (discusses the Luling Bridge), Civil Engineering, ASCE American Society of Civil Engineers, 31,  July 1984.
 ENR, Stayed -Girders Reaches Record (discusses the Luling Bridge), Engineering News Record, McGraw Hill, New York, NY, April 8, 1982,
Mangus, Alfred, “A Fresh Look at Orthotropic Technology,” "Public Roads, The US Department of Transportation, Federal Highway Administration, www.tfhrc.gov March / April 2005, Washington, D.C., pp. 38–45.
Troitsky, M. S., Orthotropic Bridges - Theory and Design, 2nd ed., The James F. Lincoln Arc Welding Foundation, Cleveland, OH, 1987.

External links

Cable-stayed bridges
Cable-stayed bridges in Canada
Bridges in Montreal
Bridges in Laval, Quebec
Rivière des Prairies
Ahuntsic-Cartierville
Road bridges in Quebec